Psilocybe inconspicua is a species of mushroom in the family Hymenogastraceae. The mushroom contains the psychoactive compound psilocybin.

See also
List of Psilocybin mushrooms
Psilocybin mushrooms
Psilocybe

References

Entheogens
Psychoactive fungi
inconspicua
Psychedelic tryptamine carriers
Fungi of North America